Adtran, Inc. is a Fibre Networking and Telecommunications company headquartered in Huntsville, Alabama. It was founded in 1985.

History 
Adtran was founded in 1985 by Mark C. Smith and Lonnie S. McMillian, and began operations in 1986, following the AT&T divestiture of the Regional Bell Operating Companies (RBOCs). It supplied network equipment to both the RBOCs and independent telephone companies in the United States.

In 2011, Adtran acquired Bluesocket, a maker of enterprise Wi-Fi equipment based in Burlington, Massachusetts.

In December 2011 Adtran announced a plan to buy the Broadband part from Nokia Siemens Networks. In 2012 Adtran’s closing of acquisition of the Nokia Siemens Networks Broadband division was finished.

In 2012, Adtran acquired Nokia Siemens Networks’ Broadband Access Business based in Germany.

In 2016, Adtran acquired CommScope's active fiber business.

In 2018, Adtran acquired connected home software provider SmartRG, a Vancouver, WA, based company that develops and provides carrier-oriented, open-source connected home platforms and cloud services for broadband service providers.

In 2021, Adtran entered into a business combination with ADVA Optical Networks SE, a cloud and mobile services networking company based in Germany.

In 2022, Adtran acquired the remaining shares of Cambridge Communication Systems (CCS) Limited, a developer of wireless backhaul and transport systems for small cells. It offers an mmWave Gigabit fiber extension system along with web-based management software for planning, configuring and monitoring networks.

Locations 
Adtran's corporate headquarters is located in Huntsville, Alabama, in Cummings Research Park. It has international offices located in:

 Melbourne, Australia
 Berlin and Greifswald, Germany
 Hyderabad, India
 Tel Aviv, Israel
 Milan, Italy
 Riyadh, Saudi Arabia
 Bratislava, Slovakia
 Tunis, Tunisia
 Basingstoke, Hampshire, United Kingdom
 Adastral Park, Ipswich, United Kingdom
 Warsaw, Poland
 Munich, Bavaria, Germany

Certifications 
The company is certified for ISO 9001, ISO 14001, ISO 27001 and TL 9000.

References

External links

Companies based in Huntsville, Alabama
Telecommunications company 
Companies established in 1986
Networking companies of the United States
Networking hardware companies
Companies listed on the Nasdaq
1986 establishments in the United States
1986 establishments in Alabama